Tokita (written: 時田, 鴇田, 常田, 土岐田 or ときた in hiragana) is a Japanese surname. Notable people with the surname include:

, Japanese anime director
Kamekichi Tokita (1897–1948), Japanese-American painter and writer
, Japanese footballer
, Japanese manga artist
, Japanese footballer
, Japanese model and television personality
Ryo Tokita, Japanese artist
, Japanese musician
, Japanese footballer
, Japanese video game developer

Japanese-language surnames